The 1991 Polish Speedway season was the 1991 season of motorcycle speedway in Poland.

Individual

Polish Individual Speedway Championship
The 1991 Individual Speedway Polish Championship final was held on 15 August at Toruń.

Golden Helmet
The 1991 Golden Golden Helmet organised by the Polish Motor Union (PZM) was the 1991 event for the league's leading riders. The final was held over two rounds.

Junior Championship
 winner - Tomasz Gollob

Silver Helmet
 winner - Jacek Rempała

Bronze Helmet
 winner - Adam Łabędzki

Pairs

Polish Pairs Speedway Championship
The 1991 Polish Pairs Speedway Championship was the 1991 edition of the Polish Pairs Speedway Championship. The final was held on 1 May at Bydgoszcz.

Team

Team Speedway Polish Championship
The 1991 Team Speedway Polish Championship was the 1991 edition of the Team Polish Championship. ZKŻ Zielona Góra won the gold medal. The team included Lars Gunnestad, Andrzej Huszcza and Jimmy Nilsen.

First Division

Second Division

References

Poland Individual
Poland Team
Speedway
1991 in Polish speedway